This is a list of cricketers who have played first-class, List A or Twenty20 matches for Zarai Taraqiati Bank Limited cricket team. The team played 119 first-class matches between 2002 and 2018, 71 List A matches between 2003 and 2018, and 10 Twenty20 matches in 2013.

Players

 Mohammad Aamer
 Aun Abbas
 Imran Abbas
 Riaz Afridi
 Tanvir Ahmed
 Saeed Ajmal
 Adnan Akmal
 Abid Ali
 Haider Ali
 Mansoor Ali
 Mohammad Ali
 Shahrukh Ali
 Yasir Ali
 Mansoor Amjad
 Iftikhar Anjum
 Shakeel Ansar
 Bilal Asad
 Naved Ashraf
 Usman Ashraf
 Faisal Athar
 Babar Azam
 Sabih Azhar
 Aamer Bashir
 Kashif Daud
 Zahoor Elahi
 Saadullah Ghauri
 Zulqarnain Haider
 Jawad Hameed
 Raza Hasan
 Javed Hayat
 Inam-ul-Haq
 Saad Janjua
 Aqib Javed
 Mohammad Khalil
 Alamgir Khan
 Imran Khan
 Sharjeel Khan
 Anas Mustafa
 Ali Nasir
 Imran Nazir
 Usman Qadir
 Afaq Raheem
 Mansoor Rana
 Abdul Razzaq
 Haseeb-ur-Rehman
 Salahuddin
 Aqib Shah
 Naseem Shah
 Usman Shinwari
 Haris Sohail
 Hussain Talat
 Sohail Tanvir
 Mohammad Umair
 Wajahatullah Wasti
 Yasir Hameed
 Mohammad Yousuf
 Shahid Yousuf
 Junaid Zia

References

Zarai Taraqiati Bank Limited cricketers